So Doggone Good is an album by saxophonist Sonny Stitt recorded in 1972 and released on the Prestige label.

Reception
In his review for Allmusic, Scott Yanow stated "the jam session-style music is reasonably enjoyable although recommended primarily for his greatest fans".

Track listing 
All compositions by Sonny Stitt except as indicated
 "Back Door" - 6:29  
 "Your Love Is So Doggone Good" (Difosco Ervin, Rudy Love) - 5:44  
 "Orange Ashtray" - 3:41  
 "I Don't Know Yet" - 7:18  
 "The More I See You" (Mack Gordon, Harry Warren) - 4:38  
 "Speculation" - 3:53

Personnel 
Sonny Stitt - alto saxophone, tenor saxophone
Hampton Hawes - piano
Reggie Johnson - bass
Lenny McBrowne - drums

References 

1973 albums
Prestige Records albums
Sonny Stitt albums